Shah Jahanabad (also Romanized as Shāh Jahānābād; also known as Rūḥābād (Persian: روح اباد), Hashtābād, and Shā Jahān) is a village in Mohammadabad Rural District, in the Central District of Zarand County, Kerman Province, Iran. At the 2006 census, its population was 3,360, in 804 families.

References 

Populated places in Zarand County